Blue Sun is a solo album by guitarist Ralph Towner recorded in 1982 and released on the ECM label.

Reception
The Allmusic review awarded the album 3 stars.

Track listing
All compositions by Ralph Towner
 "Blue Sun" - 7:21 
 "The Prince and the Sage" - 6:23 
 "C.T. Kangaroo" - 5:38 
 "Mevlana Etude" - 3:09 
 "Wedding of the Streams" - 5:10 
 "Shadow Fountain" - 6:39 
 "Rumours of Rain" - 11:02 
Recorded at Talent Studio in Oslo, Norway in December 1982

Personnel
Ralph Towner — twelve-string guitar, classical guitar, piano, Prophet 5 synthesizer, French Horn, cornet, percussion

References

ECM Records albums
Ralph Towner albums
1983 albums
Albums produced by Manfred Eicher